Pietro Delle Piane (born 21 May 1974) is an Italian actor and television personality.

Career 
He attended a theatre workshop at the age of 15. He completed his higher studies in law at the Magna Græcia University. He then moved to Rome and settled there permanently to pursue his career in acting. He eventually teamed up with director Fioretta Mari after attending his acting and diction school in 1998 and appeared in various Italian stage theatre acts. He received 2019 ITFF Prize for his role in the film Rapiscimi (2018).

In 2020, he participated as a live show guest in the 4th season of the Grande Fratello VIP accompanying Antonella Elia. Some media reports rumoured regarding the close relationship between Pietro and Antonella Elia from 2018. Recently claimed to be a foot fetishist

Filmography 

 Le ultime ore (2010)
 Bologna 2 August (2011)
 Aspromonte (2012)
 Area Paradiso (2012)
 The Final Fight (2017)
 Rapiscimi (2018)

References

External links 

 

Italian film actors
Italian television actors
Italian stage actors
1974 births
People from Cosenza
Living people